The Tronoša chronicle is a Serbian chronicle dating to 1526, transcribed by Orthodox hieromonk Josif Tronošac (Троношац) in 1791 at the Tronoša monastery near Loznica, in western Serbia. The Tronoša manuscript is the oldest survived copy, of which there are several transcriptions, one of them transcribed by Serafim. A copy is held at the monastery, while the original manuscript by Josif is held in Vienna.

The chronicle includes hagiographies of Serbian rulers.  The Battle of Kosovo (1389) is described in the chronicle, probably based on the story about the battle transferred to the region north of Sava and Danube in the first half of the 18th century. According to tradition, as included in the chronicle, Prince Lazar of Serbia and his army had a holy communion before the battle at the church in Samodreža.

See also
Serbian chronicles
Serbian manuscripts

References

Further reading 
 

Serbian chronicles
Serbian manuscripts
18th-century manuscripts
1791 books
1526 books
Cyrillic manuscripts